Afrosataspes is a genus of moths in the family Sphingidae erected by Walter Rothschild and Karl Jordan in 1903.

Species
Phylloxiphia bicolor (Rothschild, 1894)
Phylloxiphia formosa Schultze, 1914
Phylloxiphia goodii (Holland, 1889)
Phylloxiphia illustris (Rothschild & Jordan, 1906)
Phylloxiphia karschi (Rothschild & Jordan, 1903)
Phylloxiphia metria (Jordan, 1920)
Phylloxiphia oberthueri Rothschild & Jordan, 1903
Phylloxiphia oweni (Carcasson, 1968)
Phylloxiphia punctum (Rothschild, 1907)
Phylloxiphia vicina (Rothschild & Jordan, 1915)

References

 
Smerinthini
Moth genera
Taxa named by Walter Rothschild
Taxa named by Karl Jordan